White Mischief is a book by British journalist James Fox, first published in hardback 1982 by Jonathan Cape and in paperback in 1984 by Penguin. It is an account of the unsolved murder in 1941 of Josslyn Hay, the Earl of Erroll, a British expatriate in Kenya. The title is a pun on the title of Evelyn Waugh's novel Black Mischief (1932). The book was adapted as a film in 1987.

Synopsis
Part novel and part journalistic report, the book is divided into two distinct sections. Initially presented as a classic murder mystery, the first part of the story focuses on the dissolute lifestyles of the wealthy elite in colonial Kenya. Casual affairs, wife-swapping, habitual drunkenness and cocaine abuse were all common. The main protagonists are the victim, Josslyn Hay, a handsome womanising aristocrat; his beautiful married lover Lady Diana Broughton; and Diana’s much older husband Sir Delves Broughton. Although the identity of the murderer has never been discovered, the author claims to have found new evidence pointing to Sir Delves, and the second part of the book concentrates on the author’s investigations and his interviews with surviving participants in the drama, both in Kenya and in the United Kingdom.

Film adaptation
White Mischief, released in 1987, was directed by Michael Radford, and stars Charles Dance, Greta Scacchi and Joss Ackland.

References

1982 British novels
English novels
Novels set in Kenya
Novels based on actual events
British novels adapted into films
Jonathan Cape books